Medvedevsky District (Maskasola kundem) is an administrative and municipal district (raion), one of the fourteen in the Mari El Republic, Russia. It is located in the central and northern parts of the republic. Its administrative center is the urban locality (an urban-type settlement) of Medvedevo. As of the 2010 Census, the total population of the district was 67,703, with the population of Medvedevo accounting for 24.9% of that number.

Administrative and municipal status
Within the framework of administrative divisions, Medvedevsky District is one of the fourteen in the republic. It is divided into 2 urban-type settlements (administrative divisions with the administrative centers in the urban-type settlements (inhabited localities) of Krasnooktyabrsky and Medvedevo) and 16 rural okrugs, all of which comprise 158 rural localities. As a municipal division, the district is incorporated as Medvedevsky Municipal District. The two urban-type settlements are incorporated into two urban settlements, and the sixteen rural okrugs are incorporated into sixteen rural settlements within the municipal district. The urban-type settlement of Medvedevo serves as the administrative center of both the administrative and municipal district.

Notable residents 

Vladislav Vinogradov (1899–1962), Soviet military leader, born in Kuznetsovo

References

Notes

Sources

Districts of Mari El
